Unus the Untouchable (also known as Gunther Bain, born Angelo Unuscione) is a supervillain appearing in American comic books published by Marvel Comics. Unus is a mutant, and is named for his ability to consciously project an invisible force field which protects him from harm.

Publication history

Unus first appeared in X-Men #8 (November 1964), and was created by Stan Lee and Jack Kirby.

Fictional character biography

Origin
Angelo Unuscione was born in Milan, Italy. After his arrival in the United States, he legally changed his name to Gunther Bain. He became a wrestler, and, when the Beast briefly left the X-Men, he was able to defeat him in a wrestling match. Once in America, he sought out the Brotherhood of Evil Mutants to join them. He turned criminal, and joined with the Brotherhood as they fought the X-Men. During the battle, his powers were enhanced by a shot fired from Beast's gun, increasing his power beyond his ability to control it, and making him unable to touch anything. He promised to reform, and his normal power level was restored by the Beast. He became a good friend of the Blob, and they teamed up together on various schemes, such as posing as the X-Men and framing them for robbery, before both mutants went their separate ways. It was revealed the alien invader Lucifer was behind this, and had made sure the Beast's weapon did not work on Unus anymore.

Factor Three/Brotherhood
Unus then joined the villainous organization Factor Three in a conspiracy to conquer Earth. They fought the X-Men, but turned against the Mutant Master when the latter was exposed as an extraterrestrial. Unus later visited Ogre at their Mt. Charteris base. However, shortly after he was captured by Sentinels alongside several others mutants, but was later released, after which he teamed with the Blob and Mastermind as agents of the second Secret Empire; they were defeated by the Beast, and then held prisoner by the Secret Empire. Unus then joined an incarnation of Magneto's Brotherhood of Evil Mutants. As a member of the Brotherhood, Unus joined in their battle against the X-Men and Kruger. Alongside the Brotherhood, Unus battled the Defenders, but Magneto and the Brotherhood were reduced to infancy by their team member Alpha the Ultimate Mutant. Unus and the others were kept at Muir Island. When the Brotherhood was reverted to adulthood and reorganized, Unus teamed with the Vanisher, Blob and Mastermind and fought alongside the group against the Champions. However, he left the team disheartened. He came in conflict with Doc Samson, and Power Man, and then embarked on a New York crime spree, but was defeated by Iron Fist and Power Man.

Not long after, Unus decided to retire from the life of the organized supervillain, deciding to use his talents in less "lofty" ways; he was making a living as a wrestler. At some point, he fathered the Canadian mutant Radius. It is also believed that the Acolyte Carmella Unuscione is either his daughter or sister, but no official confirmation of this has ever been given.

Coming out of retirement and teaming with his friend the Blob again, Unus discovered, during a fight against the Hulk, that his powers had become nearly uncontrollable, and his field was smashed by the Hulk. Unus lost complete control of his powers, and his force-field became so thick that it repulsed the very oxygen molecules in the air until he suffocated and passed out. He fell into the arms of the Blob who, believing Unus to be dead, went on an angry rampage through Brooklyn leading to a fight with both Spider-Man and Black Cat.

Genosha
Years later, Unus reappeared on the decimated island of Genosha, traumatized by the devastation and speaking of "ghosts." Usually arrogant and somewhat fearless, due in no small part to his invulnerable force field, he was shaken by apparent "ghosts" being able to pass through it. At some point, he stopped seeing them, and returned to his former hubris.

Unus later formed his own band of mutant rebels (which included Toad and Paralyzer), trying to survive on the harsh island that Genosha had become. They most commonly had arguments with Professor Charles Xavier and Magneto, and surprisingly never recognized Magneto out of costume. In their first confrontation, the mutant known as Freakshow ends up literally swallowing Unus in order to end the tensions. His powers protected him.

Unus leads Appraiser and Stripmine, two superhuman poachers, to Genosha which caused him to be at odds with all the remaining mutants on Genosha.

House of M and death
Unus stayed on the island until before the House of M, and was depowered after the events of Decimation.

Unus is later found by Quicksilver on Genosha. Quicksilver granted him his powers back, however in an altered form. The Office of National Emergency soon stepped in and took the mists from Quicksilver and his daughter. Lockjaw managed to teleport Luna and Pietro away before ONE could capture them, leaving a battle between the Inhumans and the repowered mutants of Genosha. During the battle Unus faced Karnak, who was amazed that he could not break Unus's shield. However, Unus's powers soon evolved beyond his control and a pink metallic shell began to form all over his body. Both the Inhumans and the repowered mutants tried to save Unus's life, but it was too late. As Unus's field began to dissolve, it was discovered that he had died from lack of oxygen.

Necrosha
Unus was among the many on the island of Genosha who have been resurrected by Eli Bard and his version of the techno-organic virus. He appeared repowered by the T.O. virus.

Spider-Man and the X-Men
Unus was confirmed to be alive and repowered again after the events of Necrosha when he attacked the Jean Grey School for Higher Learning before being defeated by the then-new Special Class Guidance Counselor Spider-Man.

X of Swords
Unus became one of the many former villains granted amnesty on the mutant nation of Krakoa. During the Dawn of X event X of Swords, Unus escorted Apocalypse's grandchild Summoner through Otherworld to Arakko along with Banshee. He was taken captive by Amenthi forces during an ambush that also gravely injured Banshee. He was rescued by a Krakoan team and safely transported back to Krakoa.

Powers and abilities
Unus the Untouchable is a mutant that possessed the power to generate a field of invisible psionic energy around his body. The field acts to deflect objects and even energy beams, and can withstand great concussive force. Normally, Unus can control the force field at will and certain types of radiant energy, such as sunlight, can pass through the field, as do air and sound waves (at least within certain unknown limits). Unus has deflected beams of energy, objects of high mass, objects traveling at high speed and telepathy, including that of Charles Xavier. Unus was at one point vulnerable to the Beast's ray gun that augmented his force field power beyond his control; in later years Unus's power again became uncontrollable due to unknown reasons, finally repelling air molecules.

Unus's force field was not impenetrable, and could be disrupted by a sufficiently powerful force. The Incredible Hulk did this on two occasions, the first time by simply shattering it with a punch enhanced by his anger. When they battled again in Australia during the House of M crossover, the Hulk created a sonic boom by clapping his hands, which resonated with Unus's force field and caused shockwaves that stunned the villain. Although it was temporarily disrupted, the force field would eventually regenerate itself.

Unus is also an athletic man and an expert wrestler. Unus sometimes carried a baseball bat, which, when encased in his force field, can deliver blows with superhuman force.

Other versions

Age of Apocalypse
Unus in the Age of Apocalypse (also known as Earth-295) was a Prelate in Apocalypse's Infinites. Prelate Unus's appearance was cut short, however, as he was frozen by Iceman and shattered.

Ultimate Marvel
Unus also appeared briefly within the Ultimate Universe as a member of Magneto's Brotherhood. In this version, he had some sort of astral projection powers. In The Ultimates 3, Unus is charged with protecting Magneto's citadel from the Ultimates. His forcefield deflected blows from Thor, but, ultimately, Thor broke through and apparently killed Unus for defying a god.

House of M
In the "House of M", Unus was a lieutenant of Exodus and was eradicating the remaining human population in Australia. However, while tracking several runaway humans he stumbled upon and attempted to destroy a tribe of Aboriginal people who had adopted the Hulk into their midst. In the ensuing conflict, Unus was severely injured and put in a hospital.

X-Men Noir
In X-Men Noir, Angelo Unuscione is an unpowered human and a dangerous mob boss known as "Unus the Untouchable". Unus struggled with the Brotherhood for control of New York City. For his own security, he only let a few select people be near him, and hence his name, "untouchable." He eventually became a target for the Brotherhood after Unus refused to join in the Brotherhood's and Sebastian Shaw's illegal act in land profiting. He was to be kill by Peter Magnus when he was about to leave the city for Central City by airship. However, Unus avoided his assassination due to the X Men, and was taken to safety to Welfare Island, where he would be transferred to Washington, D.C. and under protection from the federal authorities. As Unus was about to leave with the X Men, he was killed by Eric Magnus and his men, who appeared out of nowhere.

References

External links
 
 Unus the Untouchable at Marvel Directory
 

Characters created by Jack Kirby
Characters created by Stan Lee
Comics characters introduced in 1964
Fictional characters with energy-manipulation abilities
Fictional immigrants to the United States
Fictional Italian American people
Marvel Comics martial artists
Marvel Comics mutants
Marvel Comics supervillains